A by-election was held in the Gold Fields electorate on 29 May 1865. The by-election was won by Charles Edward Haughton, who defeated two other candidates.

Background
The Gold Fields electorate was a two-member constituency, and William Baldwin and George Brodie were the initial representatives starting with the 1863 supplementary election. Baldwin resigned, and this triggered the by-election. His resignation took effect on 27 April 1865, but it was known about well before that date. Henry Wirgman Robinson was appointed as returning officer, and he set the date for the nomination meeting for Monday, 22 May, with an election to be held if required the following Monday. Robinson also defined the polling places: thirteen courthouses throughout Otago, and six campsites.

Run up to the election
Charles Edward Haughton of Arrowtown was the first person to declare his candidacy; he was first mentioned in the newspapers on 12 April. The local Queenstown newspaper, the Lake Wakatip Mail, came out in strong opposition to Haughton and thought him unqualified to represent the electorate.

Other candidates were Messrs Manders of Queenstown, James Benn Bradshaw, Duncan Campbell, and Jackson.

Nomination meeting
The nomination meeting was held at the courthouse in Lawrence, the centre of the Tuapeka district. Manders and Jackson were delayed and could not get to the meeting in time, and their nominations were not allowed. Campbell won the show of hands at the nomination meeting by a large margin, and a poll was demanded on behalf of Haughton.

Election
Haughton received 227 votes out of a total of 506; his majority was 78 votes. Bradshaw came second with 149 votes. Campbell received 130 votes.

Bradshaw put a protest to the returning officer regarding the deputy returning officer at Nevis not having received the official instructions until after the close of the poll. The returning officer declared that his deputy at Nevis had been sworn in as required, and that the instructions had not arrived in time was immaterial as no elector had come to the polling station during the day. The table below shows the results for the individual polling stations.

Bradshaw stood in the 1866 election in the  electorate and was also returned.

References

Citations

Gold Fields 1865
1865 elections in New Zealand
Otago Gold Rush
May 1865 events
Politics of Otago